Robert Riley Wallace (born October 25, 1941) is an American retired basketball coach.  He spent most of his career coaching college basketball, and was the head coach of the Hawaii Rainbow Warriors men's team from 1987 through 2007.

Early life and college playing career
Born in Alton, Illinois, Wallace graduated from Jersey Community High School in Jerseyville, Illinois in 1959. After high school, Wallace attended Centenary College of Louisiana and started at forward all three years on the Centenary Gentlemen varsity basketball team from 1960 to 1963. Wallace led Centenary in field goal percentage with at least 8 attempts per game (.450) as a sophomore in 1960–61 and rebounding (222 n the season, 8.5 per game) as a junior in 1961–62.

Wallace graduated from Centenary in 1964 with a Bachelor of Science degree in physical education.

Coaching career
After graduating from Centenary, Wallace became an assistant basketball coach at Litchfield High School in Litchfield, Illinois under Larry Little. Wallace was also track and field head coach at Litchfield High from 1964 to 1967. In 1966, Wallace became head coach and would lead Litchfield for five seasons with a 69–59 record and the 1970 regional title. Wallace completed a Master of Education degree at the University of Illinois at Urbana–Champaign College of Education in 1968.

In 1971, Wallace returned to Centenary College to be assistant basketball coach, again under Larry Little. He became head basketball coach and athletic director in 1976, then resigned midway in the 1977–78 season to be associate head coach at Hawaii, again under Little. Wallace remained in this position until 1984.

From 1984 to 1987, Wallace was head coach at Seminole Junior College in Seminole, Oklahoma and left with a 68–36 record, including consecutive 26–10 seasons.

After coaching at Seminole JC, Wallace returned to Hawaii to be head coach. When Wallace took over the program in 1987, it had suffered through four straight losing seasons, including a combined 11-43 mark during the latter two years. He guided Hawaii to nine of its 12 all-time postseason appearances, including a school-record streak of four straight from 2001-04. The Warriors appeared in the NCAA Tournament three times under Wallace and were invited to the National Invitation Tournament (NIT) on six occasions. Prior to his arrival, the program had just one NCAA appearance and two trips to the NIT.

Wallace announced his resignation following the end of the 2006-07 season on December 29, 2006.

Head coaching record

College

*Resigned in January 1978 to become associate head coach at Hawaii.

Junior college

References

External links
 Wallace profile

1941 births
Living people
American men's basketball players
Basketball coaches from Illinois
Basketball players from Illinois
Centenary Gentlemen basketball coaches
Centenary Gentlemen basketball players
Forwards (basketball)
Hawaii Rainbow Warriors basketball coaches
High school basketball coaches in the United States
Junior college men's basketball coaches in the United States
People from Alton, Illinois
People from Jerseyville, Illinois
People from Litchfield, Illinois
Sportspeople from Greater St. Louis
University of Illinois College of Education alumni